Era No. 5 — a shallow-draft steamer built in 1860 at Pittsburgh, Pennsylvania — was chartered by the Confederates early in 1863 to transport corn from the Red River to Camden, Arkansas.

After Queen of the West was lost the same day, her crew fled to Union positions in the Era No.5. Era No. 5 was then assigned to Colonel Charles R. Ellet's river fleet, fitted out with protective cotton baling and used by the Union as a dispatch boat and transport in the Mississippi River.

Notes

References

Ships built in Pittsburgh
Ships of the Confederate States Navy
Ships of the Union Navy
Steamships of the United States Navy
Dispatch boats of the United States Navy
American Civil War auxiliary ships of the United States
1860 ships
Cottonclad warships
Ships captured by the United States Navy from the Confederate States Navy